Graziosa Farina (died 5 July 1659, Rome) was an Italian poisoner.  She was one of the central figures of the infamous Spana Prosecution, one of only six to be executed among over forty people to be implicated.

Life

Graziosa Farina was born in Rome. She was recruited to the organization of Gironima Spana, which trafficked in lethal poison. Similarly to her colleague Laura Crispoldi, Farina was a saleswoman, selling the poison provided for her by Giovanna De Grandis. She does not appear to have had any direct contact with Spana herself. Described as a beggar woman, she recruited clients among the women in the many churches she visited as a beggar.

On 31 January 1659, Giovanna De Grandis was arrested and imprisoned in the Papal prison at Tor di Nona, where she made her confession on 1 February, and started to name the names of her accomplices and clients. Prior to her arrest, De Grandis had suspected that she was watched by the authorities, and left a box with Farina containing the equipment De Grandis used when making poison. Farina was named by De Grandis and arrested 7 February. She was a very cooperative witness. She was exposed to torture, confessed the day after her arrest and named a number of names. Among them were Elena Gabrielli Cassana, Angela Armellina and Elena Ferri. She was confronted with several of her co-prisoners, identified and testified toward several of them. She identified and testified against her colleague Laura Crispoldi.

On 5 July 1659, Gironima Spana, Giovanna De Grandis, Maria Spinola, Graziosa Farina and Laura Crispoldi were executed by hanging on Campo de' Fiori in Rome.

References

1659 deaths
Poisoners
17th-century Italian businesswomen
17th-century Italian businesspeople
17th-century Italian criminals
Executed Italian women
Italian torture victims
People executed by the Papal States by hanging
17th-century executions